Camp-Woods, is a historic estate with associated buildings located at Villanova, Delaware County, Pennsylvania and built on a  high spot which had been a 200-man outpost of George Washington's Army during the Valley Forge winter of 1777–78. The house, built between 1910 and 1912 for banker James M. Willcox, is a two-story, brick and limestone, "F"-shaped house in an Italianate-Georgian style. It has a slate roof, Doric order limestone cornice, open loggia porches, and a covered entrance porch supported by Doric order columns. The house was designed by architect Howard Van Doren Shaw (1869-1926). The property includes formal gardens. Its former carriage house is no longer part of the main estate. The original tennis court is now also a separate property named "Outpost Hill". The Revolutionary encampment is marked by a flagpole in a circular stone monument at the north-western edge of the property. The inscription reads, "An outpost of George Washington's Army encamped here thro the winter of Valley Forge 1777-1778".

The Camp-Woods mansion was added to the National Register of Historic Places in 1983.

Gallery

References

Houses on the National Register of Historic Places in Pennsylvania
Georgian architecture in Pennsylvania
Italianate architecture in Pennsylvania
Houses completed in 1912
Houses in Delaware County, Pennsylvania
Howard Van Doren Shaw buildings
1912 establishments in Pennsylvania
National Register of Historic Places in Delaware County, Pennsylvania